In 1996, The Gambia established diplomatic relations with the Republic of China. However, in 2013, The Gambia severed relations with the Republic of China, and recognized the People's Republic of China as the sole legitimate government of China. The People's Republic of China and Gambia established diplomatic relations in 2016.

References

China–the Gambia relations